Shanghai Hongqiao International Airport  is one of the two international airports of Shanghai and a significant airline hub of China. Hongqiao Airport mainly serves domestic and regional flights, although the airport also serves international flights.

Hongqiao Airport is the corporate headquarters and a major hub for China Eastern Airlines, Shanghai Airlines, and Juneyao Air, as well as a major hub for Spring Airlines. In 2016, Hongqiao Airport handled 40,460,135 passengers, making it the 7th busiest airport in China and the 45th busiest in the world. By the end of 2011, Hongqiao Airport hosted 22 airlines serving 82 scheduled passenger destinations. Shanghai Hongqiao Airport was also certified with the Skytrax 5-Star Airport Rating for facilities, terminal comfort and cleanliness, shopping, food & beverages, and staff service in 2019.

Hongqiao Airport served as Shanghai's primary airport until the completion of Pudong International Airport on 16 September 1999, when most international flights were gradually moved to Pudong.

History 

The construction of Hongqiao airport started in 1921. In May 1923, the airport opened for mixed civilian use. The Chinese Air Force deployed fighter-attack planes to Hongqiao in an operational response to the Shanghai Incident of 1932, and engaging Japanese carrier-based planes for the first time that day. In 1937, Hongqiao was the site of the so-called 'Oyama Incident' in which a Japanese lieutenant was shot dead by Chinese Peace Preservation Corps soldiers in the lead-up to the Battle of Shanghai. During the Second Sino-Japanese War, the airport was occupied by the Japanese and used as an air force base. Its military use continued after being handed over to the Republic of China government and, later, the People's Republic of China government. From late 1963, it was rebuilt for civilian use, and was re-opened in April 1964.  A major expansion took place from March to September 1984, and another from December 1988 to December 1991.

International era (1964–1999) 
In 1964, the original Terminal 1 and the control tower opened to public; the terminal was entirely built by the Chinese itself and was advanced of its time, equipped with many modern facilities such as barbershops, bookstores, banks, cafes, telecommunication offices, canteens, and even a hotel.The first international charter flight to Hongqiao was Pakistan International Airlines Boeing 720 from Dhaka with a stopover from Guangzhou, making it one of the very few non-communist airlines to fly into China before the Cultural Revolution. In the mid-1960s, Air France and Lufthansa both began service directly from Phnom Penh; however they are both suspended not long after. In 1972, the airport was visited by Richard Nixon using an Air Force One before flying to Peking during his visit to China.

In 1974, Japan Airlines began services from Hongqiao to Haneda.  In 1979, CAAC Airlines began services from Hongqiao to Nagasaki using a Boeing 707 aircraft; by 1985, a Trident was used for just two flights a week. After China's reform and opening up in 1978,  it then evolved into one of the busiest airports in China, alongside Beijing-Capital, particularly due to increasing passenger demand. Since 1981, Hongqiao Airport became a popular stopover for many airlines flying from Beijing to many other countries such as Canada, Japan and United States in particular. In 1985, Airbus-built aircraft started having hubs in this airport, due to it being delivered to the CAAC's Shanghai division (which would then became China Eastern Airlines). Additionally, at that same decade, many foreign airlines like Pan Am, United Airlines, Singapore Airlines, Northwest Airlines, Cathay Pacific (Dragonair replaced the Hong Kong-Shanghai route sometime in early 1990s), Canadian Pacific Air Lines (which then became Canadian Airlines International) began operating in Hongqiao around that time. During its international era, Hongqiao Airport was much different compared to today. It only has one 3,400 m runway at the time, Terminal 1 was its main terminal, and its former control tower was renovated sometime after Pudong Airport opened.

In the 1990s, many more foreign airlines began serving the airport compared to the previous decade. Examples are All Nippon Airways, KLM, Lufthansa, Thai Airways International, Swissair, Air France, Malaysia Airlines, Korean Air, Garuda Indonesia, Air Macau , Royal Nepal Airlines, Asiana Airlines, Aeroflot, and Qantas.

Domestic era (2002–present) 
The airport presently offers mainly domestic flights with the exception of Anshan, Baotou, Changchun, Dalian, Guangyuan, Jinzhou, Meizhou, Tongliao, Tongren, Zhanjiang, Zhangjiajie and some smaller cities (which all are operating at Pudong Airport only), as well as five international routes to central Tokyo's Haneda Airport, central Seoul's Gimpo International Airport, central Taipei Songshan Airport, Hong Kong International Airport, and Macau's Macau International Airport although most flights to Hong Kong and Macau are concentrated at Pudong Airport. Since August 2015, services to Haneda Airport is also focused at Pudong Airport with Juneyao Airlines, Spring Airlines and Peach operating at Pudong Airport only with All Nippon Airways, China Eastern Airlines, Japan Airlines and Shanghai Airlines operating at both airports. 

Since 1 January 2013, holders of valid passports issued by 45 countries have not needed a visa if transiting through Hongqiao Airport.

In preparation for the Shanghai Expo, on 16 March 2010, Hongqiao Airport completed a five-year 15.3-billion-yuan expansion project, which included a 3,300-meter second runway and the new Terminal 2, boosting Hongqiao's capacity to 40 million passengers a year. Terminal 2 is four times the size of Terminal 1 and houses 90 percent of all airlines at the airport (Terminal 1 is now used only for international flights and Spring Airlines and XiamenAir).  With the new runway, Shanghai became the first city in China to have five (now seven) runways for civilian use (Pudong and Hongqiao combined).

Starting from the end of 2014, Hongqiao Airport Terminal 1 underwent its biggest renovation since 1921. The entire project was scheduled for completion in 2017. On 26 March 2017, Building A of Terminal 1 was fully renovated and reopened to the public. The old Building B was closed for reconstruction, and it was expected to be revamped and open to the public in mid-2018.

Airlines and destinations

Passenger 
Hongqiao Airport mainly serves domestic flights. As of 2022, previously destinations Hongqiao Airport served such as Huaihua and Zunyi-Xinzhou have transferred all flights to Pudong Airport. Flights to Huai'an Lianshui International Airport was also served from the airport until it moved to Pudong Airport in April 2018. All flights to Anhui and Jiangsu provinces are now operating at Pudong Airport. There may be a possibility that some of the following domestic destinations may move to Pudong Airport.

Other facilities 

The airport has the head office of China Eastern Airlines, which is housed in the China Eastern Airlines Building, and was the head office of China Cargo Airlines.

Accidents and incidents 
On 17 September 1982, Japan Airlines Flight 792, a Douglas DC-8-61 bearing registration JA8048 en route to Tokyo Narita Airport, made an emergency landing, overran the runway and crashed into a drainage ditch after the hydraulic system and airbrake pressure failed. None of the 124 passengers and crew were killed aboard the aircraft.
On 15 August 1989, a China Eastern Airlines Antonov An-24, bearing the registration B-3417 and en route to Nanchang, crashed on takeoff due to an engine failure. Of the 40 occupants, 6 survived.
On 10 September 1998,  China Eastern Airlines Flight 586, an MD-11 bearing registration B-2173, made an emergency landing at the airport after the landing gear had not retracted properly while en route to Beijing. Of the 137 occupants on board, no one was killed. The footage was subsequently uploaded to YouTube.
On 15 April 1999, Korean Air Lines Flight 6316, an MD-11F bearing registration HL7373, crashed shortly after takeoff from Hongqiao Airport to Seoul. The captain then pushed the control column abruptly and roughly forward causing the plane to enter a rapid descent. Both crew members tried to recover from the dive but were unable. All three occupants onboard and five people on the ground were killed.
On 13 August 2011, Qatar Airways Flight 888, a Boeing 777-300ER en route from Doha International Airport to Shanghai's other international airport, Shanghai Pudong International Airport declared a low-fuel emergency and elected to divert to Shanghai Hongqiao International Airport. Air traffic control at Hongqiao ordered Juneyao Airlines Flight 1112, en route from Shenzhen Bao'an International Airport to Hongqiao, to terminate its approach and allow the Qatar Airways Boeing 777-300ER to land. The pilot of Juneyao Airlines Flight 1112 ignored repeated orders to abort their landing and give Flight 888 priority, ultimately forcing the Qatar Airways flight to go-around. Both aircraft landed safely without injury or damage to the aircraft. The incident led to penalties to Juneyao Airlines and the crew of the Juneyao plane by the Civil Aviation Administration of China, including the permanent revocation of the pilot's license in China.
On 7 June 2013, China Eastern Airlines Flight 2947, an Embraer EMB-145LI flying from Huai'an Lianshui Airport to Shanghai Hongqiao International Airport veered off of runway 18L at Hongqiao during landing. The plane came to a stop on an adjacent taxiway with its nose gear collapsed. No passengers or crew suffered any injuries, however, the plane received substantial damage.
On 11 October 2016, China Eastern Airlines Flight MU5643, an Airbus A320 (Registration B-2337), nearly collided with Flight MU5106 of the same airline, an Airbus A330, when the former was taking off on runway 36L while the latter was crossing the same runway under wrong instruction. The former performed a TOGA takeoff, managed to climb over the latter, and avoided a collision.

Ground transportation 

Terminal 2 of the Hongqiao Airport is immediately adjacent to Shanghai Hongqiao Railway Station, a major train hub served by the Beijing–Shanghai High-Speed Railway, the Shanghai–Hangzhou High-Speed Railway and the Shanghai–Nanjing Intercity High-Speed Railway. The airport's other terminal, Terminal 1, is across the airfield from Terminal 2.

The airport and the railway station are served by three stations of the metro network:

 Hongqiao Railway Station: Line 2, Line 10, Line 17
 Hongqiao Airport Terminal 2 station: Line 2, Line 10
 Hongqiao Airport Terminal 1 station: Line 10

The proposed extension of the Shanghai Maglev Train from Longyang Road through Shanghai South railway station to Hongqiao would connect the two airports.  At top speed, the maglev would take only 15 minutes to travel the 55 km route.  Original plans called for completing the extension by 2010, in time for the Expo 2010; however, the Hongqiao extension has been indefinitely postponed due to protests.

See also 

List of airports in China
List of the busiest airports in China

References

External links 

 Shanghai Airport Authority

Airports in Shanghai
Airports established in 1929
1929 establishments in China
Changning District
Minhang District